Six Minutes to Midnight is a 2020 British war drama film directed by Andy Goddard from a screenplay loosely based on a true story by Goddard, Celyn Jones and Eddie Izzard, starring Izzard, Judi Dench, Carla Juri, James D'Arcy and Jim Broadbent.

Six Minutes to Midnight was released in the United Kingdom on 26 March 2021, by Sky Cinema. The film received mixed reviews from critics.

Plot
Shortly before the outbreak of World War II, the Augusta-Victoria College is a finishing school for daughters of the Nazi elite, located in the English coastal town of Bexhill-on-Sea. The school is under surveillance by the British secret service and the English teacher Wheatley is a government agent. Realising his cover has been blown, he flees to town, but disappears before he can report to his handler, Colonel Smith. Another agent, Captain Thomas Miller, who is half-German and speaks the language fluently, is sent to replace him. When the girls head to the beach for a swim, they find Wheatley's body washed into the shallows.

Miller looks for clues and during a party he overhears a German diplomat tell PT instructor Ilse Keller, herself a former pupil, of plans to secretly repatriate the students to Germany. Miller rushes to town to tell Smith the news, but Keller follows him, shoots Smith and frames Miller for it. Now wanted for murder and unable to prove his credentials, Miller attempts to hide from the police.

Despite disguising himself as a bandsman in a stolen uniform and joining a parade, he is caught and incarcerated in the local police cells, from which he is extracted by government agents Captain Drey and Corporal Willis. Miller reveals his identity as a British agent to Drey, offering a microfilm stashed at the school as evidence of his role. They take the handcuffed Miller back to the school to recover the film, a copy of Keller's list of British spies in Germany. At the school, Drey is revealed to be a Nazi sympathiser, but Miller overpowers him and goes on the run again. Local bus driver Charlie sees him along the road, and drives him to his farm, where, believing his story, he uses a hacksaw to remove the cuffs. Miller finds a phone box miles from anywhere, and has just enough time to pass on the code phrase "Six Minutes to Midnight" to his superiors before Drey and Willis arrive. Miller, realising that Willis is unaware of Drey's pro-Nazi sympathies, starts talking. Drey turns and shoots Willis as his cover has been blown; Miller runs for it, and Drey takes his time casually shooting at Miller before sighting for the kill. Before Drey can fire at Miller again, the dying Willis shoots his superior.

Miller returns to the school, where headmistress Miss Rocholl finds her charges all gone. They have been led, some reluctantly, by Keller to a clifftop where they form two lines to mark out a landing strip as the sun begins to set. A Luftwaffe Junkers Ju-52 arrives and the mädchen light their flares and hold them aloft, but a following RAF Spitfire forces the plane to turn away just as Miller and Rocholl pull up in Willis' car. Keller pulls a gun, intending to shoot rebellious student Gretel, but Miller, Rocholl and Gretel convince her not to; the girls run to Rocholl, and Keller surrenders to Miller.

A few days later, Miller says goodbye to Rocholl in her office at the school, and the girls sing a parting chorus of "It's a Long Way to Tipperary". From a radio comes Neville Chamberlain's voice announcing that Britain is at war with Germany.

Cast

Production
Eddie Izzard first wrote the script with Celyn Jones, having acted together in the BBC wartime drama Castles In The Sky. The story takes place in Bexhill-on-Sea where Izzard grew up. Izzard's former girlfriend, Sarah Townsend, was originally set to direct the film following previous collaborations on documentaries with Izzard. Andy Goddard, who is known for his work on Downton Abbey was later announced as director. The same day, Judi Dench was cast as the headmistress. Lionsgate distributed the film domestically, with the international distribution rights currently up for sale.

Principal photography began on July 3, 2018 and ran for six weeks, shooting in Wales and various locations around the UK.

Release
The film was released in the United Kingdom on 26 March 2021 by Sky Cinema. It was previously scheduled to be released on 29 May 2020, by Lionsgate, but was delayed due to the COVID-19 pandemic. IFC Films distributed the film in the United States, where it was also released on 26 March 2021.

Reception
The website's critics consensus reads: "Six Minutes to Midnight has a fascinating fact-based WWII-era story to tell, but largely loses it in muddled spy shenanigans." On Metacritic, it has a weighted average score of 50 out of 100 based on reviews from 14 critics, indicating "mixed or average reviews".

In a review for RogerEbert.com, critic Nell Minow writes: "The issues of individual, cultural, and national loyalty—and when and how to respond to aggressive actions by other nations—are relegated to the background of some weak chase scenes and plot twists."

References

External links

2020 drama films
2020 war drama films
British war drama films
British World War II films
Lionsgate films
IFC Films films
Films scored by Marc Streitenfeld
Films about Nazism
2020s English-language films
2020s British films